China Girl is a 1942 drama film which follows the exploits of an American newsreel photographer in China and Burma against the backdrop of World War II. The film stars Gene Tierney, George Montgomery, Lynn Bari and Victor McLaglen, and was directed by Henry Hathaway. It is also known as A Yank In China, Burma Road and Over The Burma Road.

Plot summary
In Luchow, China, news cameraman Johnny Williams (George Montgomery) is taken into custody by the Japanese military.  He is offered $20,000 to take pictures of the Burma Road, a vital link for Allied supply that had been built to support the Chinese war effort. He isn't interested.

Johnny is put back into his cell, together with a Canadian, "Major" Bull Weed (Victor McLaglen), who claims to be serving as a Chinese irregular. His confederate, 'Captain' Fifi (Lynn Bari), smuggles a gun in during a faked tempestuous farewell, and the two men escape.

They rendezvous with Fifi, who says she saw a plane nearby at an abandoned airfield. Johnny, an ex-barnstormer expert at flying biplanes, pilots them all through a hail of Burmese anti-aircraft fire to safety in Mandalay. Upon their arrival, he bumps into his old pal, Captain Shorty Maguire (Myron McCormick), a mercenary pilot with the U.S. staffed "Flying Tigers" defending China against the Japanese.

Johnny is asked to join up, but again declines to take sides. He discovers that instead of grabbing his confiscated press credentials while fleeing Luchow, the document he picked up is something in Japanese. Bull manages to decipher just two words, and Johnny quickly loses interest upon sighting a beautiful woman nearby.

Haoli Young (Gene Tierney) has just returned from New York, where she is in school at Vassar.  She tells him that her father, Dr. Young (Philip Ahn), has a home in the city, and that she is selling off the last of her family's valuable possessions to fund a mission school he runs for orphans in Kunming.  Johnny ends up walking there, and is introduced to him.  Once alone, he presses a kiss on her, which is dispassionately received by the reserved Eurasian woman. Feeling jilted, he goes back to his hotel and picks up Fifi.

When he brings Fifi back to his room, Haoli is there waiting for him.  He promptly drops Fifi, only to learn from Haoli that Fifi and Bull are Japanese agents, and, by association, Johnny is suspected of being one too. Johnny realizes that he has been played by the pair, but tricks them into replacing the camera equipment he needs to photograph the Burma Road - this time for a big payday from the Western press.  He then tells them to get out of Mandalay or he will turn them in as Japanese agents.

Johnny stays in Mandalay, waiting to be flown over the Burma Road by his pal Shorty by tagging along on one of his solo reconnaissance flights. He meets with Haoli again and over a week of courting falls in love with her. However, just that fast she is gone with her father to Kunming, at the far end of the Burma Road. The shock sends Johnny on a bender.

Bull reports back to his Japanese commander, and is ordered to retrieve the document Johnny accidentally had taken, evidently containing military plans for an upcoming campaign against the Burma Road. When Johnny wakes up in his hotel after his night out drinking Fifi is there to warn him that Bull is coming for him. She has fallen in love with him and wants him to run away with her. She tells him that Kunming will be bombed by the Japanese shortly, which instead only sends Johnny racing there after Haoli.

He flies there with Shorty, arriving immediately after a terrible air raid, which killed her father. Johnny helps save some children that were trapped in the toppled building. During the rescue, Haoli is also killed, sending Johnny mad with grief. He rushes up to the top of a building, mans a machine gun, and downs a harrying Japanese fighter, belatedly beginning his personal war with the Japanese.

Cast
Gene Tierney as Haoli Young
George Montgomery as Johnny Williams
Lynn Bari as Captain Fifi
Victor McLaglen as Major Bull Weed
Alan Baxter as Flyer Bill Jones
Sig Ruman as Jarubi
Myron McCormick as Shorty McGuire
Robert Blake as Chandu
Ann Pennington as Sugar Fingers, the Entertainer
Philip Ahn as Dr. Kai Young
Tom Neal as Captain Haynes
Paul Fung as Japanese Governor
Lal Chand Mehra as Desk Clerk
Kam Tong as Japanese Doctor

References

External links
 
 
 

1942 films
1942 drama films
Films directed by Henry Hathaway
Pacific War films
Films with screenplays by Ben Hecht
World War II films made in wartime
Films set in Myanmar
20th Century Fox films
American drama films
Films scored by Alfred Newman
Films scored by Hugo Friedhofer
American black-and-white films
1940s English-language films